Yegin-Aul is a rural locality (a selo) in Altynzharsky Selsoviet of Volodarsky District, Astrakhan Oblast, Russia. The population was 185 as of 2010. There are 2 streets.

Geography 
Yegin-Aul is located on the Kamardan River, 19 km south of Volodarsky (the district's administrative centre) by road. Novinka is the nearest rural locality.

References 

Rural localities in Volodarsky District, Astrakhan Oblast